Sarah Reid Vinyard (born September 12, 1991) is an American actress of screen and stage. She gained attention for her role as Hermione in the 2013 film The Starving Games. Vinyard has also had an extensive career on stage, and graduated in performance theatre at Louisiana State University.

Early life
Sarah Reid Vinyard was born in Jacksonville, Florida, United States. Her mother, Sharon Vinyard, is a teacher and homemaker, and her father, Herschel T. Vinyard, Jr., is a Texas native and works as an attorney. She is the oldest of two children, with a younger brother, Thomas. Her ancestry includes French, Native American, and Irish.

Vinyard attended elementary school in Jacksonville, at Riverside Presbyterian Day School. For her secondary education, she attended Episcopal School of Jacksonville, where she explored her passion for acting, under director Katie Black. She earned her B.A. in Theatre Performance at Louisiana State University, and trained under director George Judy, and acting professor, Richard Holben.

Career
Vinyard's first major stage role was Annie Sullivan, in The Miracle Worker, followed later by Golde, in Fiddler on the Roof. Film credits include The Starving Games, American Horror Story: Coven, Search Party and Zipper. Other stage appearances include Nia, in 100, directed by Ben Watt and Eumenides, in the world premier of Dionysus of the Holocaust, by renowned playwright Femi Euba. Her most recent role was the Genesis House Nurse in the feature film, She Was Famous, directed and written by two-time New Orleans Film Festival award-winner; Kenna J. Moore.

Personal life
Vinyard currently resides in Louisiana, where she enjoys making a living in the film industry. She works in the entertainment industry in acting, casting, and in the art department. Vinyard is also active in state government. Her partner is Geoffrey Place, whom she met while both were performing in Louisiana State University's production of Dionysus of the Holocaust.

References

External links
Official website
IMDb.com
Fandango.com
Dep.state.fl.us
Wp.theatre.lsu.edu
Mayportmirror.jacksonville.com
Underarmour.teamzonesports.com

1991 births
Living people